Louis Sherman (March 8, 1907 – November 2, 1984) was a former Democratic member of the Pennsylvania House of Representatives.

References

Democratic Party members of the Pennsylvania House of Representatives
1984 deaths
1907 births
20th-century American politicians